Rahija Khanam Jhunu (21 June 1943 – 26 November 2017) was a Bangladeshi dancer. She was awarded the Ekushey Padak in 1990 by the Government of Bangladesh.

Education and career

Jhunu got admitted at the Bulbul Academy of Fine Arts (BAFA) in 1956. She performed in dance-drama "Chirokaler Bondhutto" at a program in honor of the then Chinese Premier Zhou Enlai who was visiting. She joined BAFA as an instructor in 1960 and became its principal in 1998.

Jhunu's notable students include Lubna Marium, Zinat Barkatullah, Shamim Ara Nipa, Sohel Rahman, Shaju Ahmed and Sadia Islam Mou.

Works

Dance drama
 Nakshi Kanthar Math
 Chirokaler Bondhutto 
 Surjomukhi Nodi
 Uttoroner Deshe
 Hajar Tarer Beena
 The Malady
Books
 Nrityoshilpo
 Nrityer Ruprekha

References

1943 births
2017 deaths
People from Manikganj District
Bangladeshi female dancers
Recipients of the Ekushey Padak
Bangladeshi choreographers